Zhengyia is a genus of flowering plants belonging to the family Urticaceae.

Its native range is Southern Central China.

Species:
 Zhengyia shennongensis T.Deng, D.G.Zhang & H.Sun

References

Urticaceae
Urticaceae genera